Michael James Wozniak is a British comedian, writer and actor.

He portrays Brian in the Channel 4 sitcom Man Down and is a member of the team that makes Small Scenes for BBC Radio 4.

Early life
Wozniak was born in Oxford, was raised in Portsmouth, and has a twin sister. He has Polish and Welsh ancestry.

Education
Wozniak was educated at Portsmouth Grammar School.

He studied Medicine at St George's, University of London and worked as a doctor for several years before pursuing comedy.

Career 
Wozniak worked doing live sketch comedy starting in the late 1990s, and began stand-up comedy in 2007.

He won the Amused Moose Laugh-Off contest at the Edinburgh Festival Fringe in 2008. He was nominated for the comedy newcomer award the same year. Wozniak performed at the Adelaide Fringe in 2009. Wozniak was nominated for the Edinburgh Best Comedy Show in 2013 but lost to Bridget Christie.

Television 
Wozniak's first major role in television came when he was cast in the series Man Down in 2013 alongside Greg Davies, who created and starred in the show. He played strait-laced financial adviser Brian, a friend of Davies' character.

In 2015, he wrote physical comedy Ruby Robinson for Sky Arts. It starred Kim Cattrall and a troupe of acrobats.

Wozniak appeared and came second in series 11 of Taskmaster, which started broadcast in March 2021. He has a long history with Taskmaster, having won the original Edinburgh Fringe version of the show in 2010.

Film 
In 2016, Wozniak played the role of Josh in Alice Lowe's Prevenge.

Wozniak made his directorial debut with a dramedy entitled Sump, released in 2017 and screened at various film festivals. The film has a 14 minute run time and features a character named Sally, played by Jeany Spark, whose husband is trapped in a cave with others.

In 2022 Wozniak played the alien Gordan in the science fiction comedy film We Are Not Alone.

Podcasts 
On his St. Elwick's Neighbourhood Association Newsletter Podcast, Wozniak plays the role of host Malcolm Durridge. The show focuses on the neighbourhood association newsletter of St Elwick's, a fictional ward of Exeter, forced through budgetary cuts to change from a printed edition to the "cheapest alternative": a podcast. Wozniak also appears frequently in different roles on the Beef And Dairy Network Podcast.

In 2021, he started Three Bean Salad Podcast with Henry Paker and Benjamin Partridge.

Radio 
Wozniak has appeared frequently in Tim Key's Late-Night Poetry Programme as a character called Jiffy, notably in the episodes "Accountancy" and "Cuisine". The show is an anarchic comedy series where Tim Key plans to recite poetry above the Norwegian fjords.

Filmography

References

External links

Acting and writing filmography
St. Elwick's Neighbourhood Association Newsletter Podcast

British people of Polish descent
British stand-up comedians
Living people
Actors from Oxford
Writers from Oxford
Male actors from Portsmouth
Writers from Portsmouth
1979 births